was a town located in Asakuchi District, Okayama Prefecture, Japan.

As of 2003, the town had an estimated population of 12,382 and a density of 589.34 persons per km2. The total area was 21.01 km2.

On March 21, 2006, Konkō, along with the towns of Kamogata and Yorishima (all from Asakuchi District), was merged to create the city of Asakuchi.

Dissolved municipalities of Okayama Prefecture